E2A may refer to:
E2A peptide, a 2A self-cleaving peptides.
E2A immunoglobulin enhancer-binding factors E12/E47.
Chūgoku Expressway and Kanmon Bridge, route E2A in Japan.